Cré na Cille is a 2007 Irish film directed by Robert Quinn. In the Irish language, it is an adaptation of Máirtín Ó Cadhain's 1949 novel Cré na Cille. It was released outside Ireland under the English title Graveyard Clay.

Production

Cré na Cille was filmed in various locations in Connemara, County Galway in 2006 to commemorate the centenary of Ó Cadhain's birth. It was filmed with HDCAM in a 2.35:1 aspect ratio and with Dolby Digital sound.

Plot

A graveyard in Connemara. As the members of a small community die, their spirits linger on in the grave and can speak to each other.

Release

Cré na Cille premiered in Galway in December 2006.

It screened at the 2007 Shanghai International Film Festival (shortlisted for the Jin Jue Award) and at the Irish Film Festival, Boston.

Cré na Cille won an award for Outstanding Services to the Irish Language at the 2007 Aisling Awards.

It premiered on television on TG4 on St Stephen's Day 2007.

Bríd Ní Neachtain's performance was highly praised by critics.

Awards

Legacy
Dr Seán Crosson of NUI Galway observed that "It was remarked to me by one of those involved in the production of Cré na Cille, for example, that if it had not been made this year, it would have been increasingly difficult for the work ever to have been successfully adapted as fluent speakers of the richly textured and complex Irish found in Ó Cadhain’s masterpiece become more difficult to find."

Actress Bríd Ní Neachtain appeared on an Irish 55-cent stamp in 2008, depicted in a still from Cré na Cille.

References

External links
 
 

2007 films
Irish comedy-drama films
Irish-language films